Khandesh is a geographic region in Central India, which includes parts of the northwestern portion of Maharashtra as well as Burhanpur District of Madhya Pradesh.

The use of Khandeshi Language (a.k.a. the Ahirani Language) is prevalent in this region, and the language itself derives its name from the name of the region. This language is sometimes considered as a dialect of Marathi due to its mutual intelligibility with it, and hence has lower numbers in the census due to people opting their language as Marathi instead. This region is famous for banana agriculture.

Geography 
Khandesh lies in Western India on the northwestern corner of the Maharashtra, in the valley of the Tapti River. It is bounded to the north by the Satpura Range, to the east by the Berar (Varhad) region, to the south by the Hills of Ajanta (belonging to the Marathwada region of Maharashtra), and to the west by the northernmost ranges of the Western Ghats.

The principal natural feature is the Tapti River. Unlike the rest of the Deccan, whose rivers rise in the Western Ghats and flow eastward to the Bay of Bengal, the Tapti flows westward from headwaters in southern Madhya Pradesh to empty into the Arabian Sea. The Tapti receives thirteen principal tributaries in its course through Khandesh. None of these rivers is navigable, and the Tapti flows in a deep bed which historically made it difficult to use for irrigation. Most of Khandesh lies south of the Tapti and is drained by its tributaries: the Girna, Bori, and Panjhra. The alluvial plain north of the Tapti contains some of the richest tracts in Khandesh, and the land rises towards the Satpuda hills. In the centre and east, the country is level, save for some low ranges of barren hills. To the north and west, the plain rises into rugged hills, thickly wooded, and inhabited by members of the Bhil tribe.

History

Delhi dynasties 
In 1295, Khandesh was under the Chauhan ruler of Asirgarh when Ala-ud-din Khilji of Delhi wrested control. Various Delhi dynasties controlled Khandesh over the next century.

Mughal rule 
The Mughals arrived in 1599, when Akbar's army overran Khandesh and captured Asirgarh. For a period of time, Khandesh was renamed as Dandesh in recognition of Akbar's son Daniyal. , Todar Mal's revenue settlement system was introduced in Khandesh by Shah Jahan (this system was used until British rule in 1818). The mid-17th century has been described as the time of Khandesh's "highest prosperity" owing to trade in cotton, rice, indigo, sugarcane, and cloth. Mughal rule lasted until the Marathas captured Asirgarh in 1760.

During Mughal rule, Burhanpur was the capital of the Khandesh Subah, an administrative provincial division of the Mughal Empire. Early in December 1670, Maratha forces under Prataprao made a raid into Khandesh. They advanced in rapid marches and plundered Bahadarpur, a village near Burhanpur 2 miles away from the city. But they didn't attack Burhanpur.

Maratha rule 
Maratha raids into Khandesh began in 1670 and the following century was a period of unrest as Mughals and Marathas competed for control.  In 1760, the Peshwa ousted the Mughal ruler and gained control of Khandesh, following which portions were granted to Holkar and Scindia rulers. Baji Rao II surrendered to the British in June 1818, but sporadic war continued in Khandesh which was among the last of the Peshwa's former territories to come under complete British control.

British rule 

Khandesh was a district in the Bombay Presidency.

Independent India 
After India's independence in 1947, Bombay province became Bombay State, and in 1960 was divided into the linguistic states of Maharashtra and Gujarat. East Khandesh became Jalgaon district, and West Khandesh became Dhule district, both in Maharashtra state. The latter was further divided into Dhule and Nandurbar districts.

See also 
 Khandesh Agency

References

External links 
 Imperial Gazetteer of India, v. 15, p. 225-240

Historical regions
Regions of Maharashtra